Xiazhai is a name of several locations in China:
 Xiazhai, Pinghe County, town in Fujian
 Xiazhai Township in Hubei